The list of FIBA AmeriCup-winning head coaches shows all of the head coaches that have won the FIBA AmeriCup, which is the main international competition for senior men's basketball national teams that is governed by FIBA Americas, the American zone within the International Basketball Federation.

Key

List

See also
FIBA Basketball World Cup winning head coaches
List of FIBA AfroBasket winning head coaches
 List of FIBA Asia Cup winning head coaches
List of FIBA EuroBasket winning head coaches

References

FIBA AmeriCup